The 1937 Irish Greyhound Derby took place during July with the final being held at Shelbourne Park in Dublin on July 31.

The winner Muinessa was owned by Nuala O'Byrne.

Final result 
At Shelbourne Park, 31 July (over 525 yards):

Distances 
2, ¾

Competition Report
In the final Muinessa came out top in a very competitive final with all greyhounds showing in the final. Blackstream Bridge, Tee Bawn and Western Skipper all vied for the lead until the third bend before the other three greyhounds Muinessa, Another Sunville and Sure Line all joined them. As the pack approached the fourth bend Western Skipper was marginally ahead before a decisive late burst of pace by Muinessa sealed the win.

Muinessa was bred by Simon Garrahan and owned by his niece Nuala O’Byrne and the final was a one-two finish for County Westmeath connections.

See also
 1937 UK & Ireland Greyhound Racing Year

References

Greyhound Derby
Irish Greyhound Derby